Astute may refer to:

 , launched 1945, Amphion-class submarine (United Kingdom), scrapped 1970
 , launched 2007, nuclear-powered attack submarine (United Kingdom)
 , a class of which HMS Astute (S119) is the lead ship
 , US Navy minesweeper
 Operation Astute, an Australian military operation in response to the 2006 East Timor crisis

See also